The 2018 Barcelona Open Banc Sabadell (also known as the Torneo Conde de Godó) was a men's tennis tournament played on outdoor clay courts. It was the 66th edition of the event and part of the ATP World Tour 500 series of the 2018 ATP World Tour. It took place at the Real Club de Tenis Barcelona in Barcelona, Catalonia, Spain, from April 23 through April 29, 2018.

Points and prize money

Points distribution

Prize money

Singles main-draw entrants

Seeds

1 Rankings as of April 16, 2018.

Other entrants
The following players received wildcards into the main draw:
  Novak Djokovic
  Marcel Granollers
  Pedro Martínez
  Jaume Munar
  Tommy Robredo

The following players received entry using a protected ranking:
  Andreas Haider-Maurer

The following players received entry from the qualifying draw:
  Rogério Dutra Silva 
  Bjorn Fratangelo
  Ilya Ivashka 
  Martin Kližan
  Corentin Moutet 
  Ricardo Ojeda Lara

The following players received entry as lucky losers:
  Pablo Andújar
  Ernesto Escobedo
  Jozef Kovalík
  Alexey Vatutin

Withdrawals
  Kevin Anderson → replaced by  Malek Jaziri
  Chung Hyeon → replaced by  Pablo Andújar
  David Ferrer → replaced by  Dušan Lajović
  Philipp Kohlschreiber → replaced by  Alexey Vatutin
  Andrey Rublev → replaced by  Ernesto Escobedo
  Fernando Verdasco → replaced by  Jozef Kovalík
  Horacio Zeballos → replaced by  João Sousa

Retirements
  Kei Nishikori

Doubles main-draw entrants

Seeds

 Rankings are as of April 16, 2018.

Other entrants
The following pairs received wildcards into the doubles main draw:
  Roberto Carballés Baena /  Albert Ramos Viñolas 
  Íñigo Cervantes /  David Marrero

The following pair received entry from the qualifying draw:
  Jaume Munar /  Tommy Robredo

The following pairs entered as lucky losers:
  James Cerretani /  Guillermo García López
  Nicolás Jarry /  Guido Pella

Withdrawals
Before the tournament
  Mike Bryan
  Chung Hyeon

During the tournament
  Mate Pavić

Champions

Singles

  Rafael Nadal def.  Stefanos Tsitsipas, 6–2, 6–1

Doubles

  Feliciano López /  Marc López def.  Aisam-ul-Haq Qureshi /  Jean-Julien Rojer, 7–6(7–5), 6–4

References

External links
Official website

Barcelona Open Banc Sabadell
Barcelona Open (tennis)
2018 in Spanish tennis
Barcelona Open